Isobutyryl-coenzyme A is a starting material for many natural products derived from Poly-Ketide Synthase (PKS) assembly lines, as well as PKS-NRPS hybrid assembly lines. These products can often be used as antibiotics. Notably, it is also an intermediate in the metabolism of the amino acid Valine, and structurally similar to intermediates in the catabolism of other small amino acids.

See also
 Isobutyryl-CoA mutase
 Isobutyryl-coenzyme A dehydrogenase deficiency

Coenzymes